The 2018 Thai League 2 is the 21st season of the Thai League 2, the second-tier professional league for Thailand's association football clubs, since its establishment in 1997, also known as M-150 Championship due to the sponsorship deal with M-150. A total of 15 teams will compete in the league. The season began on 9 February 2018 and is scheduled to conclude on 29 September 2018.

Chainat Hornbill are the defending champions, while Samut Sakhon, Khonkaen and Udon Thani have entered as the promoted teams from the 2017 Thai League 3.

Changes from last season

Team changes

From Thai League 2
Promoted to 2018 Thai League
 Chainat Hornbill
 Air Force Central
 PT Prachuap

Releagated to 2018 Thai League 3
 Bangkok

Releagated to 2018 Thai League 4
 Nakhon Pathom United
 Samut Songkhram

To Thai League 2
Relegated from 2017 Thai League
 Thai Honda
 Sisaket
 Super Power Samut Prakan

Promoted from 2017 Thai League 3
 Samut Sakhon
 Khonkaen
 Udon Thani

Renamed clubs
 Super Power Samut Prakan authorize from Jumpasri United
 Thai Honda Ladkrabang was renamed to Thai Honda

Expansion clubs
 Nakhon Pathom United and Samut Songkhram Club-licensing football club didn't pass to play 2018 Thai League 2. This team were relegated to 2018 Thai League 4 Western Region.
 Songkhla United Club-licensing football club didn't pass to play 2018 Thai League 3 Lower Region. This team is banned 2 years and Relegated to 2020 Thai League 4 Southern Region.
 Jumpasri United Club-licensing football club didn't pass to play 2018 Thai League 2. This team is banned 2 years and Relegated to 2020 Thai League 4 North Eastern Region.

Teams

Stadium and locations

Foreign players

A T2 team could registered five foreign players by at least one player from AFC member countries and at least one player from ASEAN member countries. A team can use four foreign players on the field in each game, including at least one player from the AFC member countries or ASEAN member countries (3+1).
Note :: players who released during summer transfer window;: players who registered during summer transfer window.↔: players who have dual nationality by half-caste or naturalization.

League table

Standings

Positions by round

Results by round

Results

Season statistics

Top scorers
As of 29 September 2018.

Hat-tricks

Attendance

Overall statistics

Attendance by home match played

Source: Thai League 2

See also
 2018 Thai League 1
 2018 Thai League 3
 2018 Thai League 4
 2018 Thailand Amateur League
 2018 Thai FA Cup
 2018 Thai League Cup
 2018 Thailand Champions Cup

References

External links
 Thai League 2 Official Website

Thai League 2 seasons
2018 in Thai football leagues
T
T